The 1951 Pacific typhoon season was a generally below average season with multiple tropical cyclones striking the Philippines. With the exception of January, each month saw at least one tropical system develop; October was the most active month with four tropical cyclones forming. Overall, there were 21 tropical depressions, of which 17 became named storms; of those, there were 16 typhoons.

The season began with the formation of a short-lived unnamed tropical storm on February 19, well east of the Philippines; Typhoon Georgia became the season's first named storm and typhoon after first developing in the open Pacific on March 20. In April, Typhoon Iris developed before intensifying into a super typhoon the following month; Iris was the first recorded instance of a Category 5-equivalent typhoon in the western Pacific. The final typhoon and storm of the year was Typhoon Babs, which remained at sea before dissipating on December 17.

The scope of this article is limited to the Pacific Ocean, north of the equator and west of the International Date Line. Storms that form east of the date line and north of the equator are called hurricanes; see 1951 Pacific hurricane season. At the time, tropical storms that formed within this region of the western Pacific were named and identified by the Fleet Weather Center in Guam. However, the Japan Meteorological Agency (JMA), which was established five years later, identified four additional tropical cyclones during the season not tracked by the Fleet Weather Center; these analyzed systems did not receive names.

Systems

Typhoon Georgia 

A persistent low-pressure area south of Kusaie was first noted on March 14. The origins of the cyclonic circulation remain disputed, with one hypothesis indicating initial development south of Nauru and another suggesting that the system originated from a minor tropical wave east of the Marshall Islands. Nonetheless, southeasterly flow associated with an unusually strong high pressure area positioned over northeastern Australia aided the tropical cyclogenesis of the disturbance, and at 1200 UTC on March 18, the circulation developed into a tropical depression. In its initial stages, the disturbance steadily intensified as it moved in a northeasterly direction, attaining tropical storm strength by 1800 UTC the next day. At the same time, the typhoon began to develop an eye. Afterwards, the intense typhoon began to quickly lose organization and strength, and degenerated into a remnant low after 0600 UTC on March 25, coinciding with the last typhoon bulletin issued by the Guam Fleet Warning Center. The remnants tracked westward before dissipating after 0600 UTC on March 28.

On March 20, Georgia passed to the south of Kwajalein. As a weakening tropical cyclone, Georgia threatened Wake Island and Eniwetok Atoll; the latter of which was expected to be the site of American nuclear testing operations. Though both islands were warned of by the Guam Fleet Weather Center, however, the typhoon had weakened considerably before reaching them, and effects remained marginal. Nonetheless,  of rain was reported on a weather station in Eniwetok. The nuclear testing operation, termed Operation George, remained unaffected, though the first test was detonated on July 4, well after Georgia dissipated.

Typhoon Hope 

In early April, several cyclonic vortices were noted south of the Marshall Islands. One of these circulation centers tracked westward and later developed into a tropical depression near Micronesia early on April 15. Steadily intensifying, the disturbance intensified into a tropical storm by 1800 UTC the next day. At roughly the same time, Hope began to curve slightly to the north. At the same time, the weather center at Andersen Air Force Base in Guam began issuing bulletins on the storm. Shortly after, Hope executed a small anticyclonic loop, which resulted in the tropical cyclone tracking westward. After this loop was completed, however, the typhoon began to weaken. This weakening trend continued, and the Guam Fleet Warning Center ceased the issuance of bulletins at 1200 UTC on April 20, by which time Hope was deemed too weak to be classified as a tropical cyclone. However, the China Meteorological Agency (CMA), in analysis of the system, determined that Hope had persisted up until late on April 23 before dissipating.

Typhoon Iris 

In late April, a well-developed tropical wave began developing east of Chuuk Lagoon. Tracking westward, the easterly wave was analyzed to have organized into a tropical depression by 0000 UTC on April 29. Twelve hours later, Iris was estimated to have strengthened into a tropical storm. Midday on April 30, Iris intensified into the equivalent of a modern-day typhoon as it moved in a slightly oscillatory path towards the Philippines. Afterwards, Iris weakened slightly before making landfall on South Luzon around 1800 UTC the following day.

After passing and weakening through the Philippines, Iris emerged into the South China Sea on May 6 as a tropical storm. At the same time, it began to recurve towards the northeast. Afterwards, the tropical cyclone underwent extratropical transition, though the timing of such an event is disputed between the JMA and the CMA, with the former indicating that such a transition occurred on May 11, and the latter indicating a transition on May 14. Nonetheless, Iris made an anticyclonic loop beginning on May 11, before accelerating northeastward and dissipating entirely on May 15. Upon its dissipation, Iris set Guam Fleet Weather Center records for number of tropical cyclone bulletins issued, at 50, and number of reconnaissance fixes, at 54. At its landfall in the Philippines, the typhoon caused nine fatalities and injured an additional 39 people. Damage to highways, bridges, and crops was estimated at ₱19.2 million (US$9.5 million).

Typhoon Joan 

A stationary trough of low pressure persisted near Nauru towards the end of April and into early May, producing heavy rains; a station on the island received  in a 24-hour period from the system. An interaction between the trough and a passing tropical wave resulted in the formation of an organized disturbance on May 2 that tracked initially northwestward before taking a more westerly course. According to the JTWC, the system became sufficiently organized to be considered a tropical cyclone on May 3, though the JMA indicates cyclogenesis three days later. Concurrently, the typhoon stalled and traced out a clockwise loop for roughly a day before resuming a course towards the northwest. Gradual weakening ensued, and the system transitioned into an extratropical cyclone after May 12; the system would dissipate three days later.

Typhoon Kate 

Aircraft traversing between Guam and the Philippines eventually confirmed the presence of a developing tropical depression by June 25, tracking towards the west. By the following day, the system had strengthened into a tropical storm. The system curved towards the north by June 28 and had begun to trend towards the northeast thereafter, gradually strengthening to a typhoon by 18:00 UTC that day. The typhoon curved eastward and continued to weaken, tracking through Sagami Bay and emerging over the Pacific Ocean on July 2 as a tropical storm. Kate transitioned into an extratropical cyclone and would later dissipate the following day.

Thirteen people died on Kyushu. Heavy rains flooded 2,000 houses and inundated 8,000 acres of farmland in Kagoshima and Miyazaki prefectures.

Typhoon Louise 

The westerly-tracking tropical wave that would develop into Typhoon Louise was closely monitored as it passed Guam on July 25. Strong winds and falling pressures documented in Ulithi strongly suggested that a tropical cyclone was developing in the vicinity. The mountainous terrain weakened the storm significantly, and Louise remained weakened system as it traversed the South China Sea before tracking over Wuchuan, Guangdong as a minimal tropical storm on August 2. The tropical cyclone degenerated into a remnant low inland the following day before dissipating entirely on August 5.

Communications were cut in Cagayan on the northeastern portions of Luzon as strong winds felled antennas. In Tuguegarao, 300 homes were blown down by winds estimated at 145& km/h (90 mph), with similar destruction wrought to homes on the coastal city of Vigan. There were six fatalities and ten people were injured. Damage was estimated at ₱5.5 million (US$2.7 million).

Typhoon Marge 

Typhoon Marge originated as a tropical storm southeast of Guam on August 10. Tracking towards the northwest, the strengthening system passed just south of the island the following day as a typhoon. Fluctuating in strength over the following days, Marge passed over the Amami Islands on August 18 before a more steadily weakening trend took hold as the typhoon moved into the East China Sea. The storm passed just offshore Shanghai before curving sharply towards the northeast into the Yellow Sea on August 21. Marge weakened to a tropical storm the next day after spending 11 continuous days as a typhoon. The cyclone made landfall near Boryeong, South Korea on August 23 and accelerated northeastwards across the Korean peninsula, transitioning into an extratropical cyclone over far-northeastern Manchuria before dissipating after August 24.

Marge was the largest tropical cyclone ever observed to date, with a wind circulation extending  in diameter; this record stood until it was eclipsed by Typhoon Tip in 1979. Meteorologist Robert Simpson flew on board a reconnaissance mission that flew into Marge near its peak strength and documented the eye's visual and sampled characteristics. The flight was an atypical departure from normal reconnaissance missions due to secondary—albeit procedurally constrained—storm-research objectives. Publishing his findings in the Bulletin of the American Meteorological Society in 1952, his work would be instrumental in the understanding of tropical cyclone structure.

United Nations naval vessels and United States Navy armaments responding to the Korean War were evacuated from the western coast of the Korean peninsula in advance of the approaching typhoon. Although damage was minimal to U.S. military installations, crop damage was extensive in other parts of Okinawa and several roads and highways were washed out by the heavy rains and surf. Impacts were more extensive further north of Kyushu, where rainfall totals as high as  produced widespread flooding that flooded rice paddies and over a thousand homes, prompting the evacuation of 11,943 people. Offshore, twelve fishing boats capsized in the rough surf, and storm surge killed four in the Kyushu village of Yoshikawa. Across southern Japan, there were 12 deaths and 53 injuries caused by Marge. In South Korea, the Busan area was particularly hard hit, with coastal flooding displacing 550 people from their destroyed wooden homes. A half-mile segment of railroad between Yeosu and Daejeon was also washed out.

Typhoon Nora 

Nora produced "some damage" over a sparsely populated region of northern Luzon and caused communications outages. In Hainan, 800 homes were destroyed along with 53 fishing boats. Two people were killed and fifteen were injured in Haikou.

Typhoon Ora 
Ora struck China

Typhoon Pat 

Yap International Airport recorded  of rain from Pat.

Typhoon Ruth 

Storm warnings were issued for southern Japan on October 13. Planes in Tokyo were grounded and courier service to Korea was suspended. Ruth impacted Japan between October 13–15, killing 572 people and injuring another 2,644; 371 people were left unaccounted for. Many of these deaths arose from river flooding triggered Ruth. The storm damaged 221,118 homes and 9,596 ships, as well as some 3.5 million bushels of rice. Due to Ruth's large size, much of the country was affected by the typhoon's winds and rains. Yamaguchi Prefecture was most severely impacted by the typhoon. Coastal areas were inundated and communications were disrupted. American military installations throughout Japan incurred over US$1 million in damage. Overall property damage in Japan was estimated at US$25 million, affecting an estimated 123,773 people; total damage to property, crops, and forests reached US$55 million.

Typhoon Sarah 
 Typhoon Sarah remained in open waters.

Typhoon Thelma 

Thelma formed as a Tropical Storm on October 27 and strengthened to category 4 status with 145 mph winds. Thelma later curved away without affecting land at all before it dissipated on October 2. It did not affect land. It was one of the strongest of the season, however damage was minimal, and no deaths were reported.

Tropical Storm Vera 

Vera remained at Tropical Storm status and did not affect land at all, thus being a minimal storm.

Typhoon Wanda 

On November 21, Typhoon Wanda moved across the Visayas and southern Luzon. The storm impacts fatally injured 82 people and displaced 213,242 others from their homes.

Typhoon Amy 

On December 3, an area of low pressure first noted near the Kwajalein Atoll developed into a tropical cyclone. Tracking in a general westward direction, the storm quickly intensified to reach typhoon intensity the next day. However, the typhoon's asymmetricity resulted in a fluctuation of intensity over the following few days. Over the ensuing two days, Amy moved over several islands in the central Philippines before emerging in the South China Sea on December 11 as the equivalent of a minimal typhoon. Shortly after, the tropical cyclone executed a tight anticyclonic loop while oscillating in strength several times before eventually weakening and dissipating on December 17, just east of Vietnam.

In the Philippines, Amy was considered one of the worst typhoons to strike the island chain on record. Making its initial landfall along with the concurrent eruption of Mount Hibok-Hibok on Camiguin, the typhoon disrupted volcanic relief operations and forced the displacement of victims already displaced by the volcano. Cebu City suffered the worst impacts of Amy – most of the city's buildings were heavily damaged, and 29 people died in the city. Strong winds and rainfall in the city associated with Amy also set records which still remain unbroken today. Damage there was estimated at ₱560 million. Along the east coast of Leyte, where Amy initially struck, ninety percent of homes were destroyed, and a large swath of coconut plantations were wiped out. In Panay, located on the western side of the Philippines, at least a thousand homes were destroyed in 41 towns. Overall, Amy caused $30 million in damage, and at least 556 fatalities, though the final death toll may have been as high as 991, making the typhoon one of the deadliest in modern Philippine history. An additional 50,000 people were displaced by the storm.

Typhoon Babs 
Typhoon Babs stayed at sea and caused no damage.

Unnamed systems 
In addition to the 17 named storms monitored by the JTWC throughout the year, 14 other cyclones were analyzed by various agencies across East Asia, some of which were estimated to have reached tropical storm strength. Furthermore, disagreement on the intensity of these storms exists between the warnings centers. The table below lists the maximum intensity reported by any one agency for the sake of completeness. However, any tropical storms listed here are not considered official and thus are excluded from the season total.

Season effects 
The following table lists all of the tropical cyclones that formed during the 1951 Pacific typhoon season, including their names, duration, intensities, damages, and death totals. Damage and deaths include totals for storms before tropical cyclogenesis and after extratropical transition. The duration of storms is based on data provided from the China Meteorological Administration, while maximum sustained wind data is provided by the Joint Typhoon Warning Center. Pressure data is provided by the Japan Meteorological Agency.

|-
| Georgia ||  || bgcolor=#| || bgcolor=#| || bgcolor=#| || Marshall Islands, Wake Island ||  ||  None ||
|-
| Hope ||  || bgcolor=#| || bgcolor=#| || bgcolor=#| || None affected || None ||  ||
|-
| Iris ||  || bgcolor=#| || bgcolor=#| || bgcolor=#| || Philippines ||  ||  13 ||
|-
| Joan ||  || bgcolor=#| || bgcolor=#| || bgcolor=#| || Nauru ||  ||  ||
|-

| Kate ||  || bgcolor=#| || bgcolor=#| || bgcolor=#| || Japan ||  ||  13 || 
|-
| Amy ||  || bgcolor=#| || bgcolor=#| || bgcolor=#| || Philippines ||  ||  569 – 991 ||
|-

See also 

 Pacific typhoon climatology
 1951 Pacific hurricane season
 1951 Atlantic hurricane season
 1950s South-West Indian Ocean cyclone seasons
 1950s Australian region cyclone seasons
 1950s South Pacific cyclone seasons

References

External links 
 Japan Meteorological Agency
 Joint Typhoon Warning Center .
 China Meteorological Agency
 National Weather Service Guam
 Hong Kong Observatory
 Macau Meteorological Geophysical Services
 Korea Meteorological Agency
 Philippine Atmospheric, Geophysical and Astronomical Services Administration
 Taiwan Central Weather Bureau
 Digital Typhoon - Typhoon Images and Information
 Typhoon2000 Philippine typhoon website